Jan Procházka (born 11 September 1984) is a Czech orienteering competitor and world champion. He won a gold medal in the relay at the 2012 World Orienteering Championships in Lausanne, together with Tomáš Dlabaja and Jan Šedivý. He runs for Finnish club Kalevan Rasti.

Prochazka has also won silver at the 2004 JWOC Relay and the European Orienteering Championships relay 10 years later.

References

External links
 
 Jan Prochazka at World of O Runners
 

1984 births
Living people
Czech orienteers
Male orienteers
Foot orienteers
World Orienteering Championships medalists